Skalmierzyce  is an urbanized village in Ostrów Wielkopolski County, Greater Poland Voivodeship, in west-central Poland. It adjoins the town of Nowe Skalmierzyce.

Skalmierzyce has a population of around 4,000. It is the administrative seat of the gmina (administrative district) called Gmina Nowe Skalmierzyce. It is the only village in Poland to be the seat of a gmina containing a town (until 2009 it shared that status with Święta Katarzyna, Lower Silesian Voivodeship).

In local speech it is often called Stare Skalmierzyce ("Old Skalmierzyce"), to distinguish it from Nowe Skalmierzyce ("New Skalmierzyce").

It was originally called Scarbimirzyce, and is first mentioned in 1343. In 1815 it found itself close to the border between Prussia and Russian-controlled Congress Poland; a customs post was set up close by, which later developed into Nowe Skalmierzyce.

Buildings of interest include St. Catherine's church, built 1791–1792 and extended in 1873.

Famous people born in Skalmierzyce

 Dr. Gunther von Hagens (born 'Gunther Liebchen', 10 January 1945), pioneering German anatomist who invented the technique for preserving biological tissue specimens called plastination.

References

Skalmierzyce
Poznań Voivodeship (1921–1939)